The 1980–81 Creighton Bluejays men's basketball team represented Creighton University during the 1980–81 NCAA Division I men's basketball season. The Bluejays, led by head coach Tom Apke, played their home games at the Omaha Civic Auditorium. The Jays finished with a 21–9 record (11–5 MVC), and won the Missouri Valley Conference tournament to earn an automatic bid to the 1981 NCAA tournament. As No. 8 seed in the Mideast region, the Jays fell to No. 9 seed Saint Joseph's in the opening round.

Roster

Schedule and results
 
|-
!colspan=9 style=| Regular season

|-
!colspan=9 style=| Missouri Valley Conference tournament

|-
!colspan=9 style=| 1981 NCAA tournament

References

Creighton
Creighton
Creighton Bluejays men's basketball seasons
Creighton Bluejays men's bask
Creighton Bluejays men's bask